Porcupine Dam (National ID # UT00251) is a dam in East Canyon in Cache County, Utah, United States.

It impounds the water of the East Fork of the Little Bear River, primarily for irrigation.

The lake is popular for fishing, boating, and camping, although there are no recreational facilities. Only primitive camping is available at the reservoir; most areas for camping are located below the dam in the canyon.

References

Dams in Utah
Reservoirs in Utah
Buildings and structures in Cache County, Utah
Dams completed in 1964
United States privately owned dams
Lakes of Cache County, Utah